John Olive (born 4 November 1996) is an Australian professional rugby league footballer who plays for the Newtown Jets in the Canterbury Cup NSW as a  and . 

He previously played for the South Sydney Rabbitohs, Gold Coast Titans and the Canterbury Bankstown Bulldogs in the NRL.

Background
Olive was born in Sydney, New South Wales, Australia. He is of Samoan descent.

He played his junior rugby league for the Kingsgrove Colts, before being signed by the South Sydney Rabbitohs.

Playing career

Early career
In 2014, Olive played for the South Sydney Rabbitohs' NYC team. In November and December 2014, he played for the Australian Schoolboys.

2015
In 2015, Olive graduated on to South Sydney's New South Wales Cup team, the North Sydney Bears. Olive went on to play 15 games for Norths in the 2015 NSW Cup scoring 10 tries. In round 14 of the 2015 NRL season, he made his NRL debut for South Sydney against the Wests Tigers. On 8 July, he played for the New South Wales under-20s team against the Queensland under-20s team. In October, he signed a 2-year contract with the Gold Coast Titans starting in 2017.

2016
In February, Olive joined the Gold Coast effective immediately after being granted a release by South Sydney a year early.

2017
On 17 August 2017, Olive dislocated his elbow and was ruled out for the rest of the season during Gold Coast's 30-8 loss to Parramatta.  On 2 February 2018, Olive signed a two-year deal to join The Canterbury Bankstown Bulldogs.

2018
Olive made his debut for Canterbury in their round 12, 14-10 loss against the Wests Tigers.  Olive spent the majority of the season playing in reserve grade for Canterbury and was part of the Canterbury sides which won the Intrust Super Premiership NSW and NRL State Championship competitions.

2019
Olive made no appearances for the Canterbury first grade team in the 2019 NRL season as he spent the entire season playing for the reserve grade team in the Canterbury Cup NSW competition.  Olive's final game for the club was the elimination final against Wentworthville which ended in a 26-20 loss with Olive scoring a try in the defeat.

On 16 September, Canterbury-Bankstown confirmed that Olive would be released by the club at the end of the season.

2020
In early 2020, Olive signed a contract to join reigning Canterbury Cup NSW premiers Newtown.

References

External links
Canterbury Bulldogs profile
South Sydney Rabbitohs profile

1996 births
Australian sportspeople of Samoan descent
Australian rugby league players
South Sydney Rabbitohs players
Gold Coast Titans players
Canterbury-Bankstown Bulldogs players
North Sydney Bears NSW Cup players
Rugby league centres
Rugby league wingers
Living people
People educated at Endeavour Sports High School
Rugby league players from Sydney